Tel Beit Shemesh is a small archaeological tell northeast of the modern city of Beit Shemesh.

It was identified in the late 1830s as Biblical Beth Shemesh – it then was known as Ain Shams – by Edward Robinson. The tel was excavated in numerous phases during the 20th century.

Etymology
Beit Shemesh means "house of the sun" or "temple of the sun" in Hebrew. The Bronze-Age city was originally named after the Canaanite sun-goddess Shapash, sometimes called Shemesh, who was worshipped there in antiquity.

The name Beth-Shemesh was shared by (at least) two other places in Israel, and one more in Egypt, presumably the site known in Greek as Heliopolis, bearing the same meaning.

In the Amarna letters Shamash is mentioned several times, along with Addu, as one of the greatest gods: the Pharaoh is "like Addu and Shamash".

History

Canaanite and Israelite town
The Canaanites of Beit Shemesh named the city after Shapash/Shemesh, the sun-goddess they worshipped. The ruins of the ancient biblical city of the Canaanites and Israelites are located at a site called Tel Beit Shemesh in Modern Hebrew and Tell er-Rumeileh in Arabic, a tell (archaeological mound) situated immediately west of modern Beit Shemesh, and Moshav Yish'i, right on the west side of Highway 38.

The earliest mention of Beit Shemesh is found in Egyptian execration texts, dating several hundred years earlier than its mention in Hebrew canonical books.

Hebrew Bible
Beit Shemesh is mentioned in the Hebrew Bible in the Book of Joshua, as a city in the territory of the tribe of Judah on the border with the tribe of Dan. In , this city was set aside as one of the 13 Kohanic cities for the priests of the tribe of Levi, the Kohanim.

The city located in the territorial bounds of the tribe of Judah is mentioned in the 6th chapter of 1 Samuel as being the first city encountered by the Ark of the Covenant on its way back from Philistia after having been captured by the Philistines in battle. The stone on which the Ark was placed is recorded as still being located there at the time of writing the Books of Samuel. In the King James Version this stone is described as "the great stone of Abel".

In , Beit Shemesh is again mentioned as being the site of the battle between King Amaziah of Judea and King Jehoash of Israel.

Iron Age to Persian period
During the 10th century BCE, Beit Shemesh emerged as an Israelite governmental center in the Sorek Valley.

An archaeomagnetic study has dated a destruction layer at the site to the first half of the 8th century BCE, correlating with the time when King Jehoash of Israel is recorded as having defeated King Amaziah of Judah in a battle fought there.

After the destruction of much of Judah by Sennacherib in 701 BCE, the city was abandoned for a while, but there seems to have been an attempt by a group of Judahites at resettling Beth Shemesh, judging by the refurbishing of the water reservoir in the 7th century BCE. However, after the Babylonian conquest of Judah in the early 580s, either the new Babylonian rulers, or the nearby Philistine metropolis of Ekron favoured by them, apparently put an end to the initiative by sealing and covering over the vital water reservoir, which was not uncovered until 2004. During the first Jewish return, at the beginning of the Second Temple period, there was no lasting revival of the city, as opposed to many other places in the vicinity such as Beit Guvrin, Maresha, and others.

Byzantine period
A monastery and other remains from the Byzantine period have been found in the area.

Ottoman period

The small Arab towns of Dayr Aban and Dayr Rafat used rocks for building from Tell er-Rumeileh (Tel Beit Shemesh).

In the late 19th century the area was known as 'Ain Shems or Khirbet 'Ain Shems and was used as a temporary harvest-time residence by local Arabs. The small mosque of Abu Mizar stood there.

State of Israel
During the 1948 Arab–Israeli War, the Egyptian army invaded the area and set up a fortified post, called "Mishlat" in Hebrew, on a hill overlooking Beit Shemesh, within the Arab village Dayr Aban. The post changed hands several times during fighting. The Harel Brigade occupied part of the post for several months, giving rise to the name "the joint post" or the "Mishlat HaMeshutaf", with 60 meters dividing them and the enemy forces. The Mishlat was finally taken by the Harel force in the Ha-Har offensive, during the night of 19–20 October 1948.

Beit Shemesh is the point from which the so-called Convoy of 35 set out to bring provisions to besieged Gush Etzion. On 15 January 1948, a group of 38 Palmach volunteers left Hartuv near Beit Shemesh. After one member of the group sprained his ankle and returned, accompanied by two others, the group, now numbering 35, continued on its way. Their presence was discovered by two Arab women who encountered two scouts of the group near Surif. (An earlier version, that the soldiers were discovered by an Arab shepherd who they graciously let go, was based on a eulogy written by Ben-Gurion and is apparently apocryphal). The Convoy of 35 was subsequently killed in fighting with Arab villagers and militiamen.

References

Hebrew Bible cities
Tells (archaeology)
Bronze Age sites in Israel
Iron Age sites in Israel
Canaanite cities
Levitical cities
Ancient Jewish settlements of Judaea
Biblical geography